Christian Wade (born 15 May 1991) is an English rugby union footballer, and former American football player, currently playing as a wing for French Top 14 club Racing 92. 

Wade played for Wasps for seven seasons and scored 82 tries in Premiership Rugby, English elite rugby union division, which places him fourth in the best try scorers list. In October 2018, he switched to American football to pursue a career in the National Football League. He spent three seasons as a running back for NFL franchise Buffalo Bills's practice squad and then returned to rugby in August 2022.   

In 2013, he was called up to the England national team and played his solitary game for his country against Argentina.

Early life
Raised in High Wycombe, Buckinghamshire, Wade attended Hamilton Primary School and Royal Grammar School. He was not initially interested in rugby union but picked it up as it was the RGS's primary sport. He represented England U16 A, England U18 and England U20, and Wasps at the Middlesex Sevens as a schoolboy. A former district and English Schools athlete, Wade ran a time of 10.8 seconds over the 100m distance at the age of 16. He was trained by the former English sprinter Julian Golding.

After finishing school, Wade studied Sport Science and Psychology at St Mary's University College in Twickenham while playing for the Wasps' academy side and then the senior team. As of 14 February 2017, he had a 0.623 tries per game ratio for Wasps with 76 tries in 122 matches. For the England Saxons, Wade had a 1.5 tries per game ratio, scoring nine tries in six matches.

Rugby union career

Club career
Wade made his debut for Wasps RFC in Abu Dhabi on 30 January 2011 against Harlequins by replacing Jack Wallace in the 48th minute of the 13–38 defeat in the 2010–2011 Season. He made three further appearances that season scoring one try against Exeter Chiefs.

Wade had a strong 2011/12 season, when despite missing three months with injury, he finished the season as the second-highest try scorer in the Premiership with nine in 15 games. At the end of the season, Wade was selected for England's tour of South Africa. He scored against the Barbarians as a replacement, and set up a try for Jonathan Joseph. He finished the England tour as the top try scorer with four, including a hat trick.

At the end of the 2012/13 season, Wade was named both the Players' Player of the Year and the Young Player of the Year after a good season for Wasps. He finished level with Wasps teammate Tom Varndell as the Premiership's joint leading try-scorer with 13. He also scored 5 tries in the 2012–13 European Challenge Cup. He scored 18 tries in 26 appearances in that season.

Wade was rewarded for his form and was called up into the England senior squad and the British and Irish Lions squad.

In the 2013/2014 season, Wade made 10 appearances and scored five tries before an injury against London Irish in November ended his season. After eight months of rehabilitation, he made his return against Saracens, scoring two tries in defeat. He scored 12 more tries in the next 21 games.

On 16 April 2016, Wade equalled the Premiership record by scoring six tries in one match against Worcester.

Return to rugby (2022–)
Wade made a return to rugby in August 2022 in a sevens tournament for French side Racing 92. A permanent move to the side was confirmed in September 2022.

International career

Sevens
He made his international sevens debut at the IRB Sevens World Series in Dubai in December 2009 and he scored 7 tries in George a week later, finishing joint top try scorer with Fijian wizard, William Ryder. He added 2 more in Wellington and 3 more tries in Las Vegas a week later. He scored 3 in London. Overall, he amassed 22 tries in 7 tournaments in the 2009–10 Series, which made him the 15th highest individual try scorer that season. Wade was selected for the 17-man initial England rugby sevens training squad for the 2010 Commonwealth Games in Delhi.

U20s
He was part of the England U20 side at the 2010 IRB Junior World Championship in Argentina, which finished 4th overall, losing to South Africa in the 3rd–4th place play-offs. He scored one try against Argentina in the tournament, which was won by 2009 winners New Zealand. On 31 May 2012, Wade made his international debut for England against the Barbarians, starting at number 11 and scoring one try while setting up Jonathan Joseph in the last play of the game with some elusive footwork, although this game was uncapped. England went on to win the game 57–26.

England, Saxons and Lions
He was selected for the England summer tour to Argentina. Wade scored in a warm up game against the Barbarians, winning 40–12. He made his full test debut against Argentina on 8 June on the right wing playing the whole 80 minutes. Wade was selected for the second game against Argentina the following week but withdrew from the team when he was called up to join the 2013 British & Irish Lions tour to Australia. He made his Lions debut on the right wing against the Brumbies Super Rugby side.

Wade was initially selected to play against Argentina in the 2013 Autumn Internationals, however a slight hamstring tear meant he had to withdraw from the game. An injury in a club game at the beginning of December against London Irish meant he played no part in the 2014 Six Nations and the Summer Tour to New Zealand.

Wade was overlooked for the 2014 Internationals, but was selected for the England Saxons to play against the Irish Wolfhounds. He was also selected for the England Saxons' tour of South Africa.

International tries

† Full international cap not awarded for Barbarians Test match 

‡ Full international cap not awarded for South African Barbarians South Test match

American football career
In October 2018 Wade left rugby to pursue a career in the NFL, with Wasps releasing him from his contract.

On 8 April 2019 Wade was allocated as a running back to the Buffalo Bills as part of the NFL's International Player Pathway program. Several months later, on 9 August 2019, for his debut with his new team, Wade had a 65-yard touchdown run on his first carry in the pre-season game against the Indianapolis Colts.

On 31 August 2019, Wade was waived by the Bills and signed to the practice squad the next day. He signed a reserve/future contract with the Bills on 6 January 2020.

On 27 April 2020, Wade was given a roster exemption as an international player for a second season. He was waived on 5 September 2020, and signed to the practice squad the next day. He was placed on the practice squad/COVID-19 list by the team on 28 December 2020, and restored to the practice squad four days later. On 26 January 2021, Wade signed a reserves/futures contract with the Bills.

On 4 May 2021, Wade was given a roster exemption as an international player for a third season. On 1 April 2022, he was released by the Bills.

References

External links 
 
 
 Wasps Profile
 Power of 10 Profile

1991 births
Living people
Rugby union wings
Rugby union fullbacks
English rugby union players
People educated at the Royal Grammar School, High Wycombe
Alumni of St Mary's University, Twickenham
Black British sportspeople
England international rugby union players
British & Irish Lions rugby union players from England
Wasps RFC players
Buffalo Bills players
Rugby union players that played in the NFL
English players of American football
Footballers who switched code
International Player Pathway Program participants
Rugby union players from Slough
English expatriate sportspeople in the United States
Expatriate players of American football